During World War II, the United States Army Air Forces (USAAF) established numerous airfields in Massachusetts for training pilots and aircrews of USAAF fighters and bombers.

Most of these airfields were under the command of First Air Force or the Army Air Forces Training Command (AAFTC) (A predecessor of the current-day United States Air Force Air Education and Training Command).  However the other USAAF support commands (Air Technical Service Command (ATSC); Air Transport Command (ATC) or Troop Carrier Command) commanded a significant number of airfields in a support roles.

It is still possible to find remnants of these wartime airfields. Many were converted into municipal airports, some were returned to agriculture and several were retained as United States Air Force installations and were front-line bases during the Cold War. Hundreds of the temporary buildings that were used survive today, and are being used for other purposes.

Major Airfields 
Air Technical Service Command
 Bedford Army Air Field, Bedford
 432nd Base Headquarters and Air Base Squadron (Reduced), 20 January 1943–10 April 1944
 144th Army Air Force Base Unit, 10 April 1944–14 October 1944
 4147th Army Air Force Base Unit, 15 October 1944–25 February 1946
 Was: Hanscom Airport (1947)
 Was: Bedford Airfield (1948)
 Now:  Hanscom Air Force Base (1948–present)
 Logan Airport, Boston
 Joint use USAAF/Navy/Civil Airport
 Now: Logan International Airport 

First Air Force
 Westover Field, Chicopee
 Unnumbered Air Base Squadron, 26th Air Base Group / 25th Air Base Squadron / 25th Base Headquarters and Air Base Squadron, 18 December 1940–10 April 1944
 112th Army Air Force Base Unit, 10 April 1944–15 January 1946
 Was Westover Air Force Base (1947-1974)
 Now:   Westover Joint Air Reserve Base (1974–present)
 Fort Devens Army Air Field, Fort Devens
 307th Air Base Squadron / 307th Base Headquarters and Air Base Squadron (June 1942), 10 February 1942–1 April 1944
 Used by United States Navy briefly around 1944
 Was: Camp Devens Airfield (1926–1934)
 Was: Fort Devens Airfield (1934–1977)
 Was: Moore Army Airfield (1945–1995)
 Now: Soon to be turned into an industrial park
 Otis Army Air Field, Falmouth
 308th Air Base Squadron (Feb 1942)/308th Base Headquarters and Air Base Squadron (June 1942), 10 February 1942–10 April 1944
 143rd Army Air Force Base Unit, 10 April 1944–1946
 Transferred to United States Navy, May 1944–1946
 Was: Otis Air Force Base (1952–1973)
 Now:  Otis Air National Guard Base (1973–present)

References
 Maurer, Maurer (1983). Air Force Combat Units Of World War II. Maxwell AFB, Alabama: Office of Air Force History. .
 Ravenstein, Charles A. (1984). Air Force Combat Wings Lineage and Honors Histories 1947-1977. Maxwell AFB, Alabama: Office of Air Force History. .
 Thole, Lou (1999), Forgotten Fields of America : World War II Bases and Training, Then and Now - Vol. 2.  Pictorial Histories Pub . 
 Military Airfields in World War II - Massachusetts

External links

 
.World War II Army Airfields
World War II Army Airfields
Airfields of the United States Army Air Forces in the United States by state
United States World War II army airfields